The special assessment on convicted persons is part of the sentence of all offenders convicted of federal crimes in the United States. It applies on a per-count basis; thus, an offender convicted of 14 counts of bank robbery would need to pay 14 $100 special assessments, for a total of $1,400. The money is used to fund the Crime Victims Fund. The sentencing judge is not authorized to waive the special assessment, even for the indigent.

References

United States sentencing law